USA-289, also known as GPS-III SV01 or Vespucci, is a United States navigation satellite which forms part of the Global Positioning System. It was the first GPS Block III satellite to be launched.

Satellite 
SV01 is the first GPS Block III satellite to be launched. Ordered in 2008 and originally intended to be launched in 2014, numerous technical delays pushed launch back to 2018. 

The spacecraft is built on the Lockheed Martin A2100 satellite bus, and weighs in at 4,400kg (9,700lbs), making SV01 the heaviest GPS satellite ever launched.

Launch 
USA-289 was launched by SpaceX on 23 December 2018 at 13:51 UTC atop expendable Falcon 9 booster B1054. The launch took place from SLC-40 of the Cape Canaveral Air Force Station, and placed USA-289 directly into semi-synchronous orbit.

Orbit 
As of 2021, USA-289 was in a 55-degree inclination orbit with a perigee of 20,158 kilometers (12,525 miles) and an apogee of 20,222 kilometers (12,565 miles). The satellite is the first GPS satellite to be able to broadcast the civilian L1C signal.

References 

Spacecraft launched in 2018
GPS satellites
USA satellites
SpaceX military payloads